Moloi is a surname. Notable people with the surname include:

Candy Moloi (1953-2020), South African actress
Dirang Moloi (born 1985), Botswanan footballer
Lerato Moloi, South African fashion model
Mpho Moloi (born 1983), South African footballer
Pontsho Moloi (born 1981), Botswanan footballer
Precious Moloi-Motsepe, South African fashion entrepreneur and philanthropist
Teboho Moloi (born 1968), South African footballer
Thabo Moloi (born 1994), South African footballer
Timothy Moloi (born 1975), South African singer

Surnames of Botswana
Surnames of African origin